Dongjak (Seoul National Cemetery) Station is a station on Line 4 and Line 9 of the Seoul Subway. Express trains on Line 9 stop at this station. As the station's subname, This station serves the Seoul National Cemetery.

Station layout

Vicinity

Exit 1: Banpo APT
Exit 2: National Cemetery Parking Lot
Exit 3: Isu Rotary
Exit 4: Seoul National Cemetery

References

Metro stations in Dongjak District
Seoul Metropolitan Subway stations
Railway stations in South Korea opened in 1985